Dødheimsgard (also known as DHG) is a Norwegian extreme metal band formed in 1994. Dødheimsgard originally played black metal, but 1999's 666 International saw them change their style into experimental and avant-garde/industrial metal. In 2000, they shortened their name to DHG.

Their name,"Dødheimsgard" is a contraction of three words: Død which means 'death', heim which means 'home' and gard which means (at least in this context) 'realm'. A natural translation into English would be "Realm of Death".

History

Founding of the band and Kronet til Konge (1994–1995) 
The band was founded in 1994. At the time they consisted of three members: Vicotnik (drums, backing vocals), Fenriz (bass, additional vocals) and Aldrahn (lead vocals and guitar) This line up recorded a promotional demo before releasing their debut album Kronet til Konge on Malicious Records in 1995. After the release of the album they recorded another promotional demo.

Monumental Possession, Satanic Art and 666 International; Aldrahn's first departure (1995–1999) 
Some time after the release of their second promo Fenriz had left the band and was replaced by Alver (bass), and Apollyon (guitar and vocals). This line up recorded the album Monumental Possession in December 1995, and released it in 1996.

For their follow up effort, an EP named Satanic Art was released in 1998. The band was joined by new members Galder (guitars), who at the time was a member of Old Man's Child and would later go on to join Dimmu Borgir, and Cerberus (bass), who replaced Alver, and Zweizz (keyboards and effects). On this release, Apollyon switched to playing the drums instead of guitar. Some time after the release of the EP, Galder and Cerberus would depart from the band.

The following year Dødheimsgard recorded their next album entitled 666 International, which was released in 1999. For this album the band had a new member, Czral, on drums, as Apollyon once again switched instruments and played bass.

Some time after the band had released their previous album, Aldrahn, Zweizz and Apollyon had departed from the band's ranks.

Supervillain Outcast (2004–2011) 
The band had been working on new material and featured new members Kvohst (vocals), Thrawn Hellspawn (guitars) and Clandestine (bass). When recording the new album the band featured Mort (samples), Czral (drums) and Bliss (programming). Aldrahn made a guest appearance on the album as well.

In 2006, they completed the album Supervillain Outcast, which was released in April 2007 by Moonfog Productions and The End Records. On January 4, 2008, it was announced that vocalist Kvohst had left the band. However, in October 2010, he had rejoined and new members Terghl (drums) and Blargh (guitars) had joined the band.

Some time during 2011, the band announced that Kvhost had once again left. In the period following Kvhost's departure it appeared that members Blargh, Thrawn Hellspawn and Clandestine had also departed from the group.

Aldrahn's return and A  Umbra Omega (2013–2016) 
In 2013, original vocalist, Aldrahn, was announced to have made his return to the group and that the band were working on a new album. The band released their fifth studio album, A Umbra Omega, on March 16, 2015. After the release of the album new members Thunberg (guitar) and L.E. Måløy (bass) had joined the group.

Aldrahn's second departure and Black Medium Current (2016–present) 
In June 2016 Vicotnik announced that Aldrahn had once again left the band due to strains on their personal relationship. The band continued to tour despite Aldrahn's absence with Vitcotnik performing lead vocals for the entirety of the shows during their arranged performance dates.

In February 2023, the band announced that Black Medium Current, their sixth studio album, would be released on April 14, 2023.

Members

Current line-up 
Vicotnik (Viper, Mr. Fixit, Yusaf Parvez) - Drums (1994-1996), Vocals (1996-1998, 2011-present) Guitar (1997-present) (Ved Buens Ende, Code, Naer Mataron)
Sekaran (Terghl) - Drums (2005-present)
Thunberg - Guitars (2013-present)
L.E. Måløy - Bass (2014-present)

Previous members
 Aldrahn (Bjørn Dencker Gjerde) - Guitar (1994-2004) Lead Vocals (1994-2004, 2013-2016) (Thorns, Zyklon-B, Urarv)
Alver (Jonas Alver) - Bass (1996) (Emperor)
Apollyon (Ole Jørgen Moe) - Guitars, Vocals (1996), Drums (1996-1998), Bass (1999)  (Aura Noir, Cadaver, Immortal)
Cerberus - Bass (1996-1998)
Czral (Carl-Michael Eide) - Drums (1999–2003) (Aura Noir, Virus, Cadaver, Ved Buens Ende, Satyricon, Ulver)
Fenriz (Gylve Nagell) - Vocals, Bass (1994-1995) (Darkthrone)
Galder (Thomas Rune Andersen) - Guitar (1998) (Old Man's Child, Dimmu Borgir)
Kvohst - Vocals (1998-2008, 2010-2011) (Grave Pleasures, Hexvessel, ex-Code)
Mr. Magic Logic/Hologram/Zweizz  (Svein Egil Hatlevik) - Keyboards, Effects (1997-2003) (Fleurety)
Thrawn Hellspawn (Tom Kvålsvoll) - Guitar (2005-2011)
Blargh - Guitar (2010-2015) (Nidingr, Blargh, Clutchpedal vs. Starfat)
Clandestine (Christian Eidskrem) - Bass (2005-2011)
Jormundgand - Synthesizer, Keyboards (2006-2011)
Void - Bass (2011-2015)

Session/live members

Session 
 Czral (Carl-Michael Eide) - Drums on Supervillain Outcast
 Mort - Samples on Supervillain Outcast
 Bliss - Programming on Supervillian Outcast

Live 
 Inflabitan - Guitar, Bass (1999)
 Øyvind Myrvoll - Drums (2013)

Discography
Kronet Til Konge (1995)
Monumental Possession (1996)
Satanic Art (MCD) (1998)
666 International (1999)
Supervillain Outcast (2007)
A Umbra Omega (2015)
Black Medium Current (2023)

References

External links
Dødheimsgard official website (currently down but being built)

DHG Interview 2007
Interview with Bjørn Dencker aka ALDRAHN 2008 on avantgarde-metal.com

Norwegian avant-garde metal musical groups
Norwegian black metal musical groups
Musical groups established in 1994
1994 establishments in Norway
Musical groups from Oslo